The 2022 Malaysia Cup Final was a football match played on 26 November 2022, to determine the champion of the 2022 Malaysia Cup. It was the final game of the 96th edition of the Malaysia Cup, organized by the Football Association of Malaysia.

The final was played at the Bukit Jalil National Stadium in Bukit Jalil, Kuala Lumpur, between Johor Darul Ta'zim and Selangor. Johor won the game 2–1 and clinched their third Malaysia Cup title, and completed their first domestic treble.

The winners should have qualified for the group stage of the 2023–24 AFC Cup. However, as Johor Darul Ta'zim had already qualified for the group stage of the 2023–24 AFC Champions League as the 2022 Malaysia Super League champions, the berth reserved was given to the third-placed team of the 2022 Malaysia Super League, Sabah.

Venue

On 18 November 2022, the Malaysian Football League announced that Bukit Jalil National Stadium would serve as the final venue.

Route to the final

Johor Darul Ta'zim

Johor Darul Ta'zim (JDT), a Super League team involved in the 2022 AFC Champions League, started in the round of 16. Their first match was an away game against their fellow Super League team, Petaling Jaya City. JDT won 4–0 away from home, before sealing their progress with a 2–0 home win, resulting in a 6–0 aggregate score. In the quarter-finals, JDT faced Kelantan, a Premier League team. They won the first game 3–0, before winning 5–0 in the return leg at home, advancing to the next round with an aggregate score of 8–0. In the semi-final round, JDT faced another Super League team, Sabah. In the first leg at Likas Stadium (away), JDT won 1–0, with the lone goal scored by Arif Aiman in the first half. In the return leg at Sultan Ibrahim Stadium (home), goals from Bergson, Fernando Forestieri, and Syafiq Ahmad gave them a 3–1 win and a 4–1 aggregate victory, which moved them to the final.

Selangor

Selangor, also of the Super League, began by facing Kelantan United in the round of 16. In the first away leg, Selangor eventually won 2–0 with a two goals scored by Caion, followed by a 1–0 victory at home, with 3–0 on aggregate. In the quarter-finals, Selangor faced their Super League rivals Negeri Sembilan. In the first leg at home, Selangor won 2–0 thanks to a goals by Caion and Aliff Haiqal. In the second leg away from home, the match ended in a 2–2 draw, but Selangor advanced through the next round with the aggregate score of 4–2. Selangor's semi-final was against another Super League club, Terengganu. Selangor started with a 3–1 home win with goals by Richmond Ankrah, Caion and Sharul Nazeem; all three goals were scored from corners. In the second leg, five days later at the Sultan Mizan Zainal Abidin Stadium, Selangor lost 1–0 with the lone goal by Kipré Tchétché, but progressed to the final with the aggregate score of 3–2.

Match details

See also
2022 Malaysia FA Cup

References

External links
FAM Official website

Malaysia Cup knockout phase
Football cup competitions in Malaysia